Axel Kevin Essengue (born 30 April 2004) is a Cameroonian professional footballer who currently plays for LA Galaxy II in the USL Championship via the LA Galaxy academy.

Career
Essengue played as part of the LA Galaxy academy. In 2021, Essengue appeared for LA's USL Championship affiliate side LA Galaxy II. He made his first appearance on 17 July 2021, appearing as a 72nd-minute substitute during a 5–0 loss to Phoenix Rising.

References

2004 births
Living people
Association football midfielders
Cameroonian footballers
Cameroonian expatriate footballers
Cameroonian expatriate sportspeople in the United States
Expatriate soccer players in the United States
LA Galaxy II players
USL Championship players
Footballers from Yaoundé